This is a list of lakes in the Kerguelen Islands, a group of subantarctic islands belonging to France in the southern Indian Ocean.

See also
 

Kerguelen Islands
Lakes in the Kerguelen Islands
Landforms of the Kerguelen Islands
Lakes
Kerguelen